Basilica of Saint Nicholas may refer to:

 Basilica of Saint Nicholas, Amsterdam, a Roman Catholic church in Amsterdam, Netherlands
 Cathedral Basilica of the Assumption of the Blessed Virgin Mary and St. Nicholas, church in Łowicz, Poland
 Basilica di San Nicola, a church in Bari, Italy

See also 
 Saint Nicholas's Church (disambiguation)
 Cathedral of Saint Nicholas (disambiguation)